Following is an incomplete list of the 2008 Decisions of the Supreme Court of Japan.

The Supreme Court of Japan (最高裁判所 Saikō-Saibansho; called 最高裁 Saikō-Sai for short), located in Chiyoda, Tokyo is the highest court in Japan. It has ultimate judicial authority to interpret the Japanese constitution and decide questions of national law (including local bylaws). It has the power of judicial review; that is, it can declare Acts of Diet and Local Assembly, and administrative actions, to be unconstitutional.

The court decided a total of 51 cases in 2008.

Decisions

See also 
Politics of Japan
Japanese law
Judicial System of Japan
Landmark Cases of the Supreme Court of Japan

References 
Decisions of The Supreme Court of Japan (Japanese language)
Decisions of The Supreme Court of Japan (English language, does not include latest cases)

Japanese case law
Decisions